Karl Palatu (born 5 December 1982) is a retired Estonian professional footballer. He played the position of defender.

International career
He made the debut for Estonian national team on 21 May 2010.

References

External links

1982 births
Living people
Sportspeople from Pärnu
Estonian footballers
Estonia international footballers
Pärnu JK Vaprus players
FC Valga players
Viljandi JK Tulevik players
FC Flora players
Sogndal Fotball players
Estonian expatriate footballers
Expatriate footballers in Norway
Estonian expatriate sportspeople in Norway
Association football defenders